Mézidon-Canon is a former commune in the Calvados department in the Normandy region in northwestern France.
On 9 September 1972, Mézidon merged with Canon to create Mézidon-Canon. On 1 January 2017, it was merged into the new commune Mézidon Vallée d'Auge.

Canon was the site of a fortress built in 1050 by Odo (Eudes) Stigand for William the Bastard, duke of Normandy, 
Odo was the first baron of Mézidon and founder of the priory of St. Barbara, known as Sainte-Barbe-en-Auge.

See also
Communes of the Calvados department
Château de Canon

References

Former communes of Calvados (department)
Calvados communes articles needing translation from French Wikipedia